Neotephria is a genus of moths in the family Geometridae described by Prout in 1914.

References

Larentiini